Martina Hingis was the defending champion, but did not compete this year. Hingis would retire from professional tennis one month later.

Kim Clijsters won the title by defeating Lindsay Davenport 6–4, 6–3 in the final. It was the 1st title in the season for Clijsters and the 11th title in her career.

Seeds
The first four seeds received a bye into the second round.

Draw

Finals

Top half

Bottom half

References

External links
 Main and Qualifying draws
 ITF tournament edition details

Women's Singles
Singles